In Spain, the historic-artistic is a legal statement that gives assets declared as historical-artistic monuments in a given locality the protection of Spanish cultural goods, which is regulated by the Ministry of Culture of Spain.

See also
 Bien de Interés Cultural

External links 
 Ministry of Culture of Spain: heritage and protected cultural property.
 Guide declared Joint Historical-Artistic in Spain.

Spanish culture
Law of Spain